Valeriana dioica, the marsh valerian, is a species of flowering plant in the genus Valeriana, native to Europe and Anatolia. It is typically found in calcareous fens. It is a dioecious species, with male and female flowers on separate individuals, and it is pollinated by small flies.

Varieties
The following varieties are currently accepted:
Valeriana dioica var. dioica
Valeriana dioica var. sylvatica S.Watson – northern North America

References

dioica
Dioecious plants
Flora of Europe
Flora of Turkey
Taxa named by Carl Linnaeus
Plants described in 1753